The LaFayette Cup was a trophy awarded to the college football champion of the state of Indiana.

References

College sports trophies and awards in the United States
Sports in Indiana
Purdue Boilermakers football
Rose–Hulman Fightin' Engineers football
Butler Bulldogs football
Hanover Panthers football
DePauw Tigers football